The Matza restaurant suicide bombing occurred on March 31, 2002, when a Palestinian Hamas suicide bomber detonated his bomb inside the Matza restaurant in Haifa, Israel, near the Grand Canyon shopping mall, killing 16 Israeli civilians and injuring over 40 people. Journalist Giulio Meotti described the attack as a massacre.

The attack
The attack occurred at 14:45 during the Passover vacation in Israel, and the restaurant was crowded with families having their lunch. Despite the Passover suicide bombing which occurred just four days earlier in Netanya, and the tense atmosphere following it, the clients and restaurant owners were not particularly worried about security:  The Matza restaurant is operated by an Israeli Arab family, and its multi-ethnic nature was thought to make it an unlikely choice for a terrorist attack.

The perpetrators
The military wing of Hamas claimed responsibility for the attack, stating that the bombings would continue as long as the siege of then President of the Palestinian National Authority, Yasser Arafat in Ramallah. In addition, Hamas spokesman stated that the suicide bomber was a 22-year-old Palestinian named Shadi Tubasi who originated from the Jenin area.

See also
List of massacres committed during the Al-Aqsa Intifada
Palestinian political violence
Israeli casualties of war

External links
 Israel hit by double suicide attack – published on BBC News on March 31, 2002
 Palestinian bomber rips open restaurant in city that prides itself on coexistence – published on the Associated Press on March 31, 2002

References

Explosions in 2002
Mass murder in 2002
Israeli casualties in the Second Intifada
Hamas suicide bombings
Terrorist incidents in Israel in 2002
Attacks on restaurants in Asia
History of Haifa
Terrorist incidents in Haifa
March 2002 events in Asia
Islamic terrorist incidents in 2002
Islamic terrorism in Israel
Building bombings in Israel
Massacres in Israel during the Israeli–Palestinian conflict